San Nicola dell'Alto is a village and comune (municipality) in the province of Crotone, in the Calabria region of southern Italy. It is an Arbëreshë village founded by Albanian immigrants to Italy in the sixteenth century.

References

External links

Arbëresh settlements
Cities and towns in Calabria